The Batinah Expressway is a 256 km 8-lane highway in Oman that connects the Muscat Expressway (a relief road in Muscat, the capital of Oman) at Halban with the United Arab Emirates border at Khatmat Malaha.

Batinah Expressway was opened  to the public, which is one of the biggest road infrastructure projects in Sultanate of Oman consists of 1,106 concrete channels, 25 bridges crossing wadis, 17 overhead bridges, 12 tunnels and other technical preparedness to overcome terrestrial obstacles.  The Expressway  has four lanes in each direction was completed in a time span of six years, built at a cost of RO 800 million. This investments and resources opened up new horizons for people, economy and the society. While designing this mega project, all security and safety aspects related standards and specifications were taken into account to keep pace with developments in this area.  It has also made traffic between the Sultanate of Oman and the United Arab Emirates easier. However the road is hardly used due to the non availability of any support facilities such as fuel pumps, restaurants or maintenance facilities. Some areas of the road do not have mobile network coverage and certain areas do not have street lights. There is absolutely no police patrolling and very few working speed cameras. The road is totally deserted most of the time and is more of a white elephant. 

The Sultanate has always given much importance to road infrastructure. It has developed networks of roads linking vast governorates from north to south, east to west which can keep pace with the economic and social growth in the country and boost the development process in all areas. The completion of road infrastructure will help in diversification of economy, thus boosting sectors like tourism, mining, industry and other commercial activities..

This vital road link — Al Batinah Expressway — will help the growing economic movement in the governorate, especially due to Port of Sohar and import and export activities in  the area where we see massive industrialization in the close proximity of the port and the free zone.

In the next stage of the advancement of the national economy, we will see coming up of Science and Technology City, University of Oman and the Logistics City. There will also be a medical city as part of the major economic projects which would transform the life in the country and open up new horizons of development to keep pace with future advancements.

See also
 Muscat Expressway
 Transport in Oman

References

2017 establishments in Oman
Expressways in Oman